Foy Williams (born 27 September 1973 in Kingston, Jamaica) is a Canadian retired sprinter who specialised in the 400 metres. She represented Canada at the 2000 Summer Olympics, as well as two outdoor and one indoor World Championships.

Competition record

Personal bests
Outdoor
200 metres – 23.44 (+0.3 m/s) (Ottawa 2001)
400 metres – 51.62 (Flagstaff 2000)
Indoor
400 metres – 53.39 (Lisbon 2001)

References

1973 births
Living people
Canadian female sprinters
Athletes (track and field) at the 2000 Summer Olympics
Olympic track and field athletes of Canada
Athletes (track and field) at the 1998 Commonwealth Games
Athletes (track and field) at the 2002 Commonwealth Games
Athletes (track and field) at the 1999 Pan American Games
Pan American Games track and field athletes for Canada
Sportspeople from Kingston, Jamaica
Jamaican emigrants to Canada
Naturalized citizens of Canada
Commonwealth Games medallists in athletics
Commonwealth Games bronze medallists for Canada
World Athletics Championships athletes for Canada
Black Canadian female track and field athletes
Olympic female sprinters
Medallists at the 1998 Commonwealth Games